Breeds of dog used as model organisms for laboratory study include:

 Laboratory beagles

Former research breeds:
 Český strakatý pes  originally bred for lab purposes

Animal models